Bodhisattva vow may refer to:
The Bodhisattva vow taken by Mahayana Buddhists
Bodhisattva Precepts#Brahma Net Sutra, the monastic vows used in some schools of Buddhism in Japan and Korea
"Bodhisattva Vow", a track from the Beastie Boys' 1994 album Ill Communication.